Berry is a small Australian village in the Shoalhaven region of the New South Wales South Coast, located  south of the state capital, Sydney. It has many historical buildings which are listed on the New South Wales Heritage Register. Berry attracts many tourists who come to enjoy the diversity of landscapes, including coastal beaches, rich dairy farming, and forested mountains. The village hosts a local Produce Market which is held twice each month on the second Saturday and fourth Sunday. Together with Kiama  to the north, Berry acts as a gateway through to other towns and villages along the South Coast of NSW via the Princes Highway and the South Coast railway line. Major highway building projects in and around Berry have now bypassed the village, creating uninterrupted motorway conditions for coastal travel south to Nowra and the South Coast and north to Wollongong and Sydney. This has resulted in the removal of all but local and visitor traffic within the village. Planning is underway to create a pedestrian-friendly precinct in and around Queens Street (the main commercial street).

History

The Aboriginal people of the area were the Wodi Wodi people of the Dharawal nation, and the area was known as Boon-ga-ree. In the 1810s, George William Evans, Government Surveyor, reported on the Berry district as a possible  settlement and on the good stands of red cedar. Subsequently, itinerant timber cutters visited to cut and send cedar to Sydney.

Alexander Berry, with his business partner Edward Wollstonecraft, pioneered European settlement in the Shoalhaven region from 1822, initially securing land grants to the south of the Shoalhaven River and later to the north (including the Berry district). The locality was known as Broughton Creek from its beginning in 1825 as a private town and part of a large pastoral holding called "Coolangatta". The first European settlers of this locality were seven free sawyers employed by Alexander Berry, who camped there in 1825. Soon after a tannery began operation. In the 1840s a saw mill powered by a water wheel started. By 1866, a very substantial town had grown on the either side of Broughton Creek. On the Pulman Street side a post office, school, tannery and store were established, while on the other side of the creek an Inn was opened. By this time the population had grown to 300 and the area was declared a Municipality.

In 1873 Alexander Berry died and his brother David Berry became the owner of the estate. He encouraged the growth of the town by establishing an Agricultural Showground and giving land to four religious denominations to build churches in the town.

The name of the town was changed from Broughton Creek to Berry in 1889, following the death of David Berry, Alexander's brother, to honour the Berry family. After his death the outlying land of the Coolangatta Estate was gradually sold. The town continued to grow and flourish as a service centre for saw milling and dairying industries. From the 1980s, these industries have diminished, and tourism is now an important activity.

Heritage listings 
Berry has a number of heritage-listed sites, including:
 Beach Road: David Berry Hospital
 Illawarra railway: Berry railway station
 135 Queen Street: Berry Museum
 58 Victoria Street: Berry Courthouse

Geography and landmarks

The township of Berry lies on the South Coast railway line, and on the Princes Highway (Highway 1) between Nowra and Kiama. For much of its early history the town depended on timber cutting and dairy farming, with a tannery and boat building also present, but today, Berry thrives on tourism, with many souvenir shops, art galleries, antiques and collectibles shops, cafes, restaurants, and hotels. A local public hospital bequeathed by the Berry family, the David Berry Hospital, now serves as a rehabilitation hospital and palliative care hospice.

Population and culture
At the  the population of Berry was 2,667. 79.2% of people were born in Australia. The next most common country of birth was England at 6.9%. 92.5% of people only spoke English at home. The most common responses for religion were No Religion 27.5%, Anglican 23.8% and Catholic 19.6%.

Berry has formed a mainly urban rather than farming community, with an influx of city dwellers attracted to a rural lifestyle with ease of access back to the Sydney metropolitan area and its attractions ('sea changers' and 'tree changers'). Most dairy farms have been subdivided into 'hobby farms' of small acreages, and the town businesses have changed to meet needs of tourists and the expanding hospitality industry.

Berry is the first truly rural town south of Sydney, and is situated on a coastal plain bounded by the escarpment to the west, and the Tasman Sea to the east. The township of Berry is surrounded by the districts of Broughton Vale, Broughton Village, Foxground, and Toolijooa to the north, Harley Hill, Far Meadow, Jerry Bailey/Coolangatta and Back Forest to the east (with the beaches of Gerroa, Seven Mile Beach, and Shoalhaven Heads along the coast), Jaspers Brush and Meroo Meadow to the south, and Bundewallah, Bellawongarah, Cambewarra, Woodhill, Wattamolla, and the village of Kangaroo Valley are situated in the mountains to the west.

Events
Some regular events that draw locals and tourists alike to Berry include: country markets on the first Sunday of the month; the Berry Agricultural & Horticultural Show on the first weekend in February; the Musicale festival held throughout May and June; and the Garden Festival in October. Berry is also home to the Berry Magpies rugby league team, part of the New South Wales Group 7 rugby league competition and the Berry netball team.

During the annual Berry Agricultural & Horticultural Show there is held the Annual Berry Showgirl Competition. This is an event where young women aged between 18 and 25 are judged on various attributes including personality, rural knowledge, presentation, communication and speaking skills, and local and international current affairs throughout a full day of judging.  The judging panel consists of three judges selected by the Show Committee. Judging involves a sit down luncheon during the day which is attended by showgirl entrants and judges, followed by individual interviews, and then concluding that evening with a ball, or formal dance, where each entrant is required to give a speech. The winner is announced on the Saturday night of the annual show, in the center of the main oval, in front of the crowd. The winner then goes on to represent Berry at the Zone judging which encompasses towns from Milton to the Hawkesbury region. Zone winners then compete at the final stage, which is a weeks judging held at the Sydney Royal Easter Show. This event, run by the Royal Agricultural Society, is not a beauty contest but rather a way of promoting and encouraging rural women.

Notable people 
 Alexander Berry (1781 - 1873): Scottish merchant and pastoralist who, with Edward Wollstonecraft, secured land grants in the Shoalhaven area in 1822 and 1830.
 David Berry (1795 - 1889): Agriculturalist who emigrated from Scotland to New South Wales in 1836 and joined his brother Alexander Berry. He helped to develop an agricultural society among the increasing Shoalhaven tenantry.
 Jeff Carter (1928 - 2010): Australian author, filmmaker and photographer.
 Dorothy Cawood MM (1884 - 1962): Nurse, matron of the David Berry Hospital, 1928–1943.
 Bill Collins (1934 - 2019):  Film critic and historian, radio and television presenter, journalist, author and lecturer.
 Bettie Fisher (1939 - 1976): Australian Aboriginal activist, singer and theatre administrator.
 Garry McDonald (born 1948): Actor, satirist and comedian, particularly known for his portrayal of the character "Norman Gunston", and later as "Arthur Beare" in the ABC sitcom Mother and Son 
 John McDonell (born 1943): rugby league player
 Broughton O'Conor (1868-1953): politician and barrister
 Jennifer Robinson (born 1981): Rhodes Scholar and human rights lawyer.

See also 
 Moeyan Hill
 Group 7 Rugby League
 Coolangatta Estate

References

External links

 Berry Directory (published by Berry Chamber of Commerce & Tourism)

 
City of Shoalhaven
Towns in New South Wales
Towns in the South Coast (New South Wales)